The Confédération générale de la production française (CGPF: General Confederation of French Production) was a French manufacturers' association.

Foundation

The Confédération générale de la production française (CGPF) was created at the initiative of Étienne Clémentel.
It was founded on 19 March 1919, bringing together 21 employers' federations in an attempt to unite previously competing groups.
The CGPF demanded complete freedom from government interference, but the right to participate in any government action that might affect the interests of its members.
The Union des industries et métiers de la métallurgie (UIMM) acted in effect as the instrument of the Comité des forges steelmakers' association for handling social issues.
The UIMM provided logistic support to the Confédération générale de la production française (CGPF), with the result that the CGPF was accused of being simply a puppet of the steel industry.

History

The Fédération des Associations Régionales (FAR), founded in 1919 to represent provincial businesses, was absorbed into the CGPF in 1923.
By 1936 the CGPF had 28 branches.
The CGPF claimed to represent all employees, but in fact was mainly controlled by large industrial concerns with headquarters in Paris, particularly metallurgy companies, and was weak in areas such as commerce and banking.
The CGPF made its views public on all major issues that affect the economy or social organization. 
It had special committees to review tax and tariff issues.
In the financial crisis of 1925 the CGPF supported Raymond Poincaré's policy and opposed that of the Cartel des Gauches.

The government generally chose the CGPF as the agency to represent employers on governmental committees.
Thus the CGPF participated in the National Economic Council, National Council of Handicrafts, Higher Council on Educational Methods, Higher Commission on Occupational Diseases, Industrial Hygienic Commission and Commission on Engineering Awards. 
The CGPF represent French employers at the International Labor Office.
The CGPF was the voice of French industry at the International Economic Conference (1927), International Committee of Economic Experts (1931) and Lausanne Conference (1932).

Before 1936–36 the CGFP was handicapped by rivalry among the different industrial groups and by lack of a strong domestic opponent.
The International Labor Office said of the CGPF that, "In practice ... the General Confederation of Production is, beyond doubt, only a permanent meeting place for the heads of different federations; its power is ephemeral, inasmuch as it depends on their consent, and yet considerable, if, by the exchange of views, it brings about unanimity between them.
The growing power of the General Confederation of Labour (CGT: Confédération générale du travail) forced the CGPF to transform itself into a more effective organization.

When the CGPF central council met on 15 May 1936, just after the election of the Popular Front, it was still mostly concerned with minor internal arrangements. 
Aymé Bernard was the only member who brought up a political situation. He said, 

On 7 June 1936 Alexandre Lambert-Ribot, secretary general of the Comité des forges, signed the Matignon Agreements to end the general strike that had ensued.
CGPF President René-Paul Duchemin signed on behalf of French employers.
Forces led by the de Wendels and Rothschilds, who were hostile to Duchemin's labour policies, forced an Extraordinary General Assembly in August 1936 to reform the CGPF, which was renamed the Confédération générale du patronat français (CGPF) and given a new constitution and leadership.

Publications

Publications included:

Notes

Sources

Trade associations based in France
1919 establishments in France
1936 disestablishments in France